El Ayoun (Arabic: العيون ) is a town in Kasserine Governorate, Tunisia, population 18634 (2004 census).

See also Hajeb El Ayoun

References

Former populated places in Tunisia
Communes of Tunisia